Theodore Guy Buckner (December 14, 1913, St. Louis, Missouri - April 12, 1976, Detroit, Michigan) was an American jazz saxophonist. He was the brother of Milt Buckner.

Buckner was raised in Detroit, where he played very early in his career before joining McKinney's Cotton Pickers. He was best known for his time spent in the orchestra of Jimmie Lunceford, where he remained from 1937 to 1943. After working with Lunceford, Buckner primarily played locally in Detroit, where he worked into the 1970s. His activities included small jazz combos, work in the Motown studios, and co-leading a big band with Jimmy Wilkins, Ernie Wilkins's brother. He toured Europe in 1975, and also appeared in the New McKinney's Cotton Pickers that decade.

References
Peter Vacher, "Ted Buckner". The New Grove Dictionary of Jazz.
[ Ted Buckner] at Allmusic

Further reading
John Chilton, Who's Who of Jazz.

1913 births
1976 deaths
American jazz saxophonists
American male saxophonists
20th-century American saxophonists
20th-century American male musicians
American male jazz musicians